Black Hawk Township is located in Jefferson County, Iowa. The population as of the 2020 Census is 327.

References

Townships in Jefferson County, Iowa
Townships in Iowa